WLBK (1360 AM) is an American radio station licensed to serve the community of DeKalb, Illinois. The station, established in 1947, is owned and operated by DeKalb County Broadcasters, Inc.

The station was assigned the call sign "WLBK" by the Federal Communications Commission (FCC).

Programming
WLBK broadcasts a news/talk radio format to DeKalb County, Illinois, and surrounding communities. Weekday broadcasts , include local news, weather forecasts, and community information, plus agribusiness updates, business news from CNBC, and hourly news reports from CNN Radio. WLBK also airs a tradio program titled Trading Post. Weekday syndicated shows include Dr. Joy Browne, The Dave Ramsey Show, and Yahoo! Sports Radio. Weekend programming , includes repeats of Dr. Joy Browne, Animal Planet, SportsMap Radio, religious services, plus talk shows about politics, antiques, home improvement, and suicide prevention.

In season, WLBK broadcasts local high school football, the Chicago White Sox (MLB), Chicago Bulls  (NBA), and Chicago Bears (NFL). WLBK is the flagship station for Northern Illinois University Huskies football, men's basketball, and women's basketball.

History

Early days
In 1946, DeKalb Radio Studios, Inc., applied to the FCC for a construction permit for a new broadcast radio station to operate with 500 watts of power on a frequency of 1360 kilohertz. The new station was assigned call sign "WLBK". After construction and testing were completed, the station signed on December 5, 1947.

WLBK was originally co-owned by Roland Wallem and T.A. "Ted" Lanes. Wallem served as the new station's business manager and Lanes was both commercial manager and program director. Charles Green was WLBK's original chief engineer. By 1950, Robert C. Brown was both station manager and program director with Donald Whitman as sales manager and Clayton DeWitt as chief engineer.

1950s
In 1951, George Spitz became president of DeKalb Radio Studios, Inc. Robert C. Brown continued as general manager and added both sports director and farm director duties. Zenophon Beake was the chief engineer, Don Ulery the news director, and Lois Montgomery as women's director. In 1952, Ted Beauchamp took over the program director duties with Robert Senne as chief engineer, Don Ulery as sports director, and Lois Montgomery Still, women's director.

In 1953, George C. Biggar took over as president of DeKalb Radio Studios, Inc. Biggar also took the general manager and farm director roles. Richard Meier moved up to commercial manager, Robert C. Brown remained as program director and added promotions manager duties, with Robert Zirk as chief engineer and Herb Carroll as both news director and sports director. This lineup would remain stable through the 1950s with the additions of Russell Pigott of news director and W. Dean Clayton as chief engineer.

1960s
Seeking to expand its coverage area and to be able to deliver programming outside its legally mandated daylight-only operation, WLBK applied to the FCC to create an FM sister station to be known as "WLBK-FM". The new station received its broadcast license on December 17, 1961, and simulcast the AM station's programming during the day while originating its own programming at night. As the FM band grew more popular, WLBK-FM began originating more of its own programming. By 1970 only 30% of its content was a WLBK simulcast and by 1976 the total was down to 15%. The FM station was spun off with fully independent programming and a new call sign ("WDEK-FM") in 1977. , the former WLBK-FM is licensed as WCLR.

Concurrent with the launch of the FM station, WLBK received authorization from the FCC to double its own power output from 500 to 1,000 watts. The 1960s saw other changes for the station. In 1963, Richard M. Hubbell became WLBK's commercial manager and Roger L. Belke took over the chief engineer role.

The biggest change came on August 30, 1965, when Jerome F. Cerny acquired DeKalb Radio Studios, Inc. He also took on the titles of president and general manager. Ralph Sherman became the new station manager while Russell Pigott remained as news director and Robert C. Brown kept his job as program director. This lineup of key players remained steady through the rest of the 1960s.

1970s-1980s
The station maintained its long-time beautiful music/middle of the road format through the 1970s and 1980s. As a full service station, WLBK also broadcast local news, up to a dozen hours of farm reports each week, plus national news from United Press International. The 1970s also saw Bill Cerny take the reins as station manager while Jerome F. Cerny remained company president and Robert C. Brown shifted to farm director duties.

In 1980, Jerome F. Cerny added chief engineer to his list of duties and resumed his role as the station's general manager. Bill Cerny became both program director and music director while Dick Kliesch was named news director. With Jerome F. Cerny's retirement to Sarasota, Florida, Paul B. Christensen became WLBK's chief engineer in 1981.  In 1984, Dianne Leifheit assumed the role of general manager with Jay Burt as news director and Jeff Glass as chief engineer. In April 1985, WCFL Chicago weekend talent Mark Powell was hired as program director and midday host. Powell would take a leave of absence in 1986 and run a protest write in effort in the March 1986 GOP congressional primary. Powell would return to the station until the following year when he was elected 7th Ward Alderman in the City of DeKalb.

1990s-2000s
1990 saw the end of music programming on WLBK as it shifted to a full service all-news radio format full-time. Mark Charvat joined the station as program director with Geoff Gillette as news director and Jim Casey as chief engineer. After multiple accusations that he exposed himself to guests, reportedly saying “Daddy needs a little sucky sucky” and “Oopsie! I did a pee-pee in my Thomas the Tank Engine panties,” program director Mark Charvat was quietly let go. The news/talk format would persist through the rest of the 1990s.

After more than five decades of continuous ownership, DeKalb Radio Studios, Inc., agreed to sell WLBK to Big City Radio-Chi, LLC, in April 1998. The FCC approved the sale on June 18, 1998, and the transaction was formally consummated on February 25, 1999. This would prove short-lived as in December 1999 Big City Radio-Chi, LLC, (Charles M. Fernandez, president and CEO) applied to transfer WLBK and its broadcast license to WPW Broadcasting, Inc., (David T. Madison, president and CEO). The deal gained FCC approval on February 8, 2000, and formal consummation occurred on April 12, 2000.

2010s
In September 2010, WPW Broadcasting, Inc., (Don Davis, president) contracted to sell WLBK to DeKalb County Broadcasters, Inc., (Larry Nelson, president) for $575,000. The deal was approved by the FCC on November 10, 2010, and the transaction was formally consummated on December 24, 2010.

References

External links
WLBK official website

LBK
News and talk radio stations in the United States
Radio stations established in 1947
DeKalb County, Illinois
1947 establishments in Illinois